Tokhm Del (also Romanized as Tokhomdel; also known as Tokhumdil and Tokhundil’) is a village in Ozomdel-e Shomali Rural District, in the Central District of Varzaqan County, East Azerbaijan Province, Iran. At the 2006 census, its population was 660, in 169 families.

References 

Towns and villages in Varzaqan County